The Kanoo Group (Arabic: مجموعة كانو) is a large family-owned by  conglomerate based in the UAE and Oman. It is a part of the parent company Yusuf Bin Ahmed Kanoo Group (established in ), founded in Bahrain by Haji Yusuf Bin Ahmed Kanoo which started from a trading and shipping enterprise. From Bahrain, the business spread to Saudi Arabia in the 1930s.

Business overview
The family business first made its name in the shipping industry, challenging the long-established British firms that had come to dominate the Arabian Peninsula. Kanoo Shipping is the first Arab shipping agency in the region in 1911 and one of the founders of S5 Agency World Ltd. At present, Kanoo Shipping is the largest regional shipping agency in the Middle East which operates in 20 countries and all principal ports and offshore tanker loading terminals around the Arabian Peninsula, including Iraq.

Kanoo Shipping handles 20,000 port calls every year through its professional network, which covers all ports in the Suez to Sri Lanka range and East/South Africa and recently has launched operations in India. The new agency office in Mumbai, Kanoo Shipping India, will allow Kanoo Shipping to have complete port coverage in India. In addition to its fully owned offices and joint ventures, the company's regional network operates through established partners in Egypt, Jordan, Lebanon, Pakistan, India, Sri Lanka, Seychelles, Kenya, Tanzania, Mozambique and Mauritius.

Similarly, the family's involvement in the travel industry dated back to 1937 when Kanoo Travel began providing refuelling facilities for Imperial Airways, the first British commercial long-haul airline, for flights en route to India and Australia. In 1947, Kanoo Travel became the first IATA agency in the Middle East and the first travel company in the Middle East to receive the ISO certification in 1997.

In the mid-1960s, Kanoo Machinery used to supply construction and material handling equipment in the region. At that time, the UAE was just setting up its oil and gas industry and developing its infrastructure.

Today, the family-run business has diversified business industries from shipping, travel, machinery; to logistics, property, oil & gas, power industrial chemicals, training, joint ventures, retail and commercial activities, and operates extensively throughout Saudi Arabia, Bahrain, United Arab Emirates, Oman, Yemen and Qatar.

Divisions

Kanoo Shipping

Kanoo Shipping is a regional shipping service provider in the Middle East. With regionally centralised operations, finance and communications, the Kanoo office network, cover an extensive area, including the Persian Gulf, the Red Sea and Indian Sub-continent. Kanoo Shipping handles 20,000 port calls every year and has offices in 20 countries.
 Kanoo Marine (Marine Craft Operations) - Operates its own fleet of offshore service boats for transfer of personnel, spare parts, consumables and other requirements to vessels at anchorages and offshore locations; also with fleet of specialist offshore craft available for charter 
 Port Agency - Provides handling of all owner's or charterer's husbandry and operational requirements on vessels calling at ports throughout the Middle East 
 Liner Representation - Provides canvassing, commercial, documentation and operational supervision services required by regular liner operators at ports throughout the Middle East
 Cargo Broking - Arranges shipping for non-containerized cargo e.g. projects, heavy lifts, vehicles, bulk parcels etc., moving both into and out of ports in the Middle East; using its global contacts of ship owners and operators
 Kanoo CrewCare - Facilitates the transfer of On and Off Signing Crew and their baggage between international airports and vessels at ports and anchorages throughout the Middle East
 Offshore Logistics - Provides husbandry and operational support to vessels engaged in installation, survey, and other offshore works such as securing work permits and vessel clearances, arranging crew and spares movement, organising local supplies and technical assistance and attending to medical and other emergencies
 Kanoo Yacht Services - Kanoo Yacht Services provides servicing of specialist requirements of Super Yachts throughout the UAE, as well as Oman, Saudi Arabia, Qatar and Bahrain. It also offers a concierge service. Kanoo Yacht Services is the preferred and appointed Agent on yacht handling for the annual Abu Dhabi Formula One Grand Prix.

Kanoo Travel
Kanoo Travel operates a network of IATA locations and travel partners in key market areas in Saudi Arabia, Bahrain, United Arab Emirates, Qatar, Oman, Egypt, Lebanon, United Kingdom and France. It is one of the largest and oldest travel management companies in the Middle East.

In 1980, Kanoo Travel began to represent American Express in Bahrain and Saudi Arabia solely as its official travel representative. Later in 2003, Kanoo Travel again signed a master franchise agreement with American Express that covered North Africa, the Levant, GCC including Iraq and the CIS countries. Kanoo Travel works with the American Express Travel Service Network throughout the Middle East by identifying and acquiring member agencies into the Kanoo Travel/American Express Middle East Franchise program.

American Express Middle East operates in 16 markets in the Middle East and North Africa region and issues dollar currency credit and charge cards. It also offers a range of local currency-denominated credit cards which are accepted in more than 200 countries and territories worldwide.

Services:
 Kanoo Corporate - business travel services
 Kanoo Limousine Services - for all VIP transfers
 Kanoo Retail - travel services for individual travellers
 MICE - meetings, incentives, conventions and events
 Kanoo Holidays - for all types of leisure travel
 Kanoo Marine - marine and Offshore travel services
 General sales agents (GSAs) for international airlines
 Visa services

Kanoo Holidays
Kanoo Holidays is a specialist division of Kanoo Travel with office networks and dedicated Kanoo Holidays Centers in Riyadh, Jeddah, Al Khobar, Saudi; Bahrain, Qatar, Oman, and UAE.

The Travel Attaché
The Travel Attaché represents the Kanoo Travel brand as its inbound Destination Management Company and Luxury Travel Management arm.

Kanoo Machinery
Kanoo Machinery LLC  is a construction, materials handling, floor cleaning and agricultural equipment distributor in the UAE. Products from these principals are marketed through product specialist from sales and aftermarket in all its five branches (Dubai, Abu Dhabi, Al Ain, Sharjah and Ras Al Khaimah) in the UAE.

KANRENT

Kanoo Equipment Rental (KANRENT) offers rentable equipment.

 Hyster – forklifts and material handlers
 Bobcat – telehandlers
 Sullair – electric & diesel powered air compressed
 Aisle-Master – material handling
 Utilev – material handling
 Tennant – contract cleaning

Stor-Mat Systems
Stor-Mat Systems was formed in March 1993 and officially became a member of The Kanoo Group in April 2011. Stor-Mat Systems is one of few locally based storage and material handling companies with the in-house expertise to carry out the design of complex storage facilities.
 Storage Systems - The company represents manufacturers including Eonmetall and Metech.
 Docking Equipment - Stor-Mat is the official agent of INKEMA dock levelling equipment and industrial doors. INKEMA specialises in loading and unloading of goods and for access control through industrial doors and dock shelters.
 Material Handling Equipment - Stor-Mat Systems represents brands such as Hyster, UTILEV and Aisle-Master for a range of forklifts and warehouse equipment in the industry.

Kanoo Oil & Gas
Kanoo Oil & Gas supplies specialist products and services for the oil, gas and petrochemical industries in the Middle East. Its major clients include Saudi Aramco, SABIC, ADNOC, BAPCO, SEWA, DEWA, and PDO.

Power & Industrial Projects
Kanoo Power & Industrial Projects (P&IP) used to operate as a General Trading Division and was changed to P&IP in 1999 to expand its operations and to increase its activities. Kanoo P&IP provides industrial products and power and desalination products and services across the Middle East. These services include consultancy, product sales, equipment leasing and servicing. Its customers include Saudi Aramco, Emirates Airlines, GAMCO, ADMA-OPCO, ZADCO, and J.Ray McDermott.

Kanoo Industrial Products
Kanoo Industrial Products (KIP), a part of Kanoo P&IP provides consultancy, site survey for safety, product sales, equipment leasing and equipment servicing.

Strategic Business Units:
 Machine Tools and Services - a range of CNC / conventional machines
 Industrial Corrosion Inhibitors - offers chemical technology, in partnership with Cortec Corporation USA. Cortec's range of products is based on the renowned "vapor phase corrosion inhibition" concept.
 Industrial Tools & Consumables - MRO products and tools
 Industrial Safety Products - a range of industrial safety products for various industrial applications. 
 Fall Protection, Confined Space & Rescue Systems - offers height safety equipment and services, in partnership with the Capital Safety Group (DBI Sala & Protecta). All equipment supplied meets international standards including OSHA, ANSI, CSA & CE.

KRT
Kanoo Rapid Transit (KRT) provides express deliveries and gulf-wide cargo distribution within the local market and lower Persian Gulf states. It was founded in 1990 and headquartered in UAE, with branches in Qatar and Oman. KRT also expanded its local services to cover Bahrain and the Kingdom of Saudi Arabia. UAE operations are controlled from Dubai through strategic offices throughout the country.

H.A.K Industrial Chemicals
H.A.K Industrial Chemicals (L.L.C.) is a supplier of speciality chemicals, equipment and other raw materials for specific industries located in UAE and the region.
 Composites (GRP) & Synthetic Marble
 Paints & Coating, Printing Inks & Construction Chemicals
 Rubber & Plastic products
 Personal Care and Pharmaceutical
 Adhesives, Cleaning & Water Treatment Chemicals

Kanoo Freight
Kanoo Freight LLC provides supply chain, freight/logistics and brokerage in the region and around the globe through its GCC network offices in UAE, Bahrain, Saudi Arabia, Oman and Qatar, as well as international partners.

 International freight forwarding – air or marine
 Specialized export packing
 Door to door air and marine cargo
 Sea-air cargo via Dubai, consolidation and contract logistics
 Customs compliance & transportation
 Packing and household removal services – door to door
 Project & heavy lift cargo movements
 Exhibition services
 Warehousing & distribution
 3 PL movements
 Courier services

Kanoo Exhibition Organizers
Kanoo Exhibition Services provides special project cargo services as well as several other services from travel to design and construction of exhibition stands. Kanoo Exhibition Services covers all major cities in the Middle East and expanding to cover other markets and regions.
 Import and export of goods via air, sea and land
 Clearing and forwarding
 On-site handling
 Stand design and construction
 Travel and accommodation

BRC Arabia LLC

BRC Arabia LLC is a premier leader in reinforcing steel production that offers:

 Cut & bent steel rebar
 Welded wire mesh
 Cold rolled/drawn steel wires
 Rebar threading with joint couplers
 Rebar trading

The Kanoo Group completed the acquisition of balance shares of former joint venture partner BRC Arabia and became its sole owner on June 6, 2012. BRC has been headquartered in Dubai Industrial City Seih Shuaib 3 since November 2011. BRC Arabia was formerly known as BRC Arabia FZC and operated in Sharjah Airport Free Zone (SAIF) from 1996.

Kanoo Business Centre
Kanoo Business Centre (KBC) provides startup base for companies seeking to do business in the UAE. Located in Abu Dhabi and Dubai, KBC provides administration, accounting, and secretarial services.

Gemini
GEMINI Software Solutions is owned by Yusuf Bin Ahmed Kanoo. GEMINI is based in Technopark, Trivandrum.

Timeline
 1911 - Kanoo Shipping's first agency: The Arab Steamers LTD (1911) 
 1945 - Kanoo Travel Agency became the first dedicated travel agency to exist in the Middle East
 1949 - YBA Kanoo installed the first automatic telephone; the number was "25"
 1950 - Kanoo Shipping's first lightering contract was signed with ARAMCO
 1960 - YBA Kanoo installed its first computer, an NCR 390

References

Companies based in Dubai
Conglomerate companies of the United Arab Emirates